Nakhu Jail (Nepali:नख्खु कारागार, Nakhu Karagar) was established in 2007 BS in the existing, money printing area (Taksar department) in Lalitpur District, Nepal. The facility has an area of 35 ropanies and 12 ana (about 1.8 hectors). There is a road at the eastern part of the jail, a school at the west, residential area at the north and Nakhu river at the south.

There are two separate blocks for male and female. Each block has capacity of accommodating 250 inmates. It is planned to upgrade it with a capacity to accommodate 1,000 inmates in 2077 BS.
There is also a Community Rehabilitation Center and the Drug Rehabilitation Center inside the jail.

Notable inmates
Mohammad Aftab Alam-suspended member of the House of Representatives for charge against the crime for production of explosives and murder.
KP Sharma Oli-as political prisoner 
Padma Ratna Tuladhar-as political prisoner

Jailbreaks
C. P. Mainali escaped the jail when he was taken as political prisoner 
A British inmate escaped the jail in October 2018. He was arrested the next day.

See also
List of prisons in Nepal

References

Prisons in Nepal